Drepana uncinula, the spiny hook-tip, is a moth in the family Drepanidae. It is part of the Drepana subgenus Watsonalla. It is found in France, Spain, Portugal, Italy and the western and southern part of the Balkan Peninsula. It was first described by Moritz Balthasar Borkhausen in 1790.

The wingspan is 18–30 mm for males and 25–35 mm for females. There are three generations per year, with adults on wing from April to the end of September.

The larvae feed on Quercus species, including Quercus ilex.

References

External links
Lepiforum.de

Moths described in 1790
Drepaninae
Moths of Europe
Taxa named by Moritz Balthasar Borkhausen